sRNA-Xcc1 (small RNA identified from Xanthomonas campestris pv. campestris) is a family of trans-acting non-coding RNA (also known as small RNA). Homologs of sRNA-Xcc1 are found in a few bacterial strains belonging to alpha-proteobacteria, beta-proteobacteria, gamma-proteobacteria, and delta-proteobacteria. In Xanthomonas campestris pv. campestris, sRNA-Xcc1 is encoded by an integron gene cassette and is under the positive control of the virulence regulators HrpG and HrpX.

Origin and phylogenetic distribution 
sRNA-Xcc1 is encoded by a gene cassette in the integron of Xanthomonas campestris pv. campestris and homologs of sRNA-Xcc1 are frequently found in integron gene cassettes cloned from uncultured bacterium, it is possible that sRNA-Xcc1 is originally captured by integrons from natural environments. sRNA-Xcc1 homologs are found in a few taxonomically far related strains across alpha-, beta- and gamma-proteobacteria but not in close related bacteria, implying that sRNA-Xcc1 is transferred via horizontal gene transfer (HGT). sRNA-Xcc1 homologous gene are found located on Tn5542, a transposon carried by the plasmid pHMT112, indicating that the horizontal transfer of sRNA-Xcc1 is realized by means of transposons and/or plasmids.

Potential biological function 
The expression of sRNA-Xcc1 is under the positive control of the two important virulence regulators HrpG and HrpX of Xanthomonas campestris pv. campestris, indicating that sRNA-Xcc1 may be involved in the pathogenesis of the pathogen.

References

Phylogenetic diagrams

RNA